is a Japanese professional 6-dan Go player.  She is a disciple of Honda Sachiko.

References

External links
 Nihon Ki-in profile (in Japanese)

Living people
1987 births
Japanese Go players
Female Go players
Go players at the 2010 Asian Games